Psychometry may refer to:
 Psychometry (paranormal), a form of extrasensory perception
 Psychometrics, a discipline of psychology and education
 Psychometric Entrance Test, a standardized academic test used in Israel

See also 
 Psychrometrics, the measurement of the heat and water vapor properties of air
 Psychophysics, the relationship between physical stimuli and the sensation they produce